Alice Kilonzo–Zulu, (née Alice Kilonzo), is a Kenyan economist and bank executive, who serves as the managing director of Ecobank Rwanda, a commercial bank licensed and supervised by the National Bank of Rwanda, the central bank and national banking regulator.

Background and education
Alice Kilonzo was born in Kenya circa 1969. She studied at the University of Warwick, in the United Kingdom, graduating with a BA in Politics with International Studies, in 1992. Later, she obtained a MA in Economics & Social Studies from the University of Manchester in 1993.

Career
Her career in banking goes back to June 1995, when she took up employment with Citibank Kenya, as a relationship manager, serving in that capacity for over six years. She was then promoted to senior relationship manager, responsible for public sector enterprises, where she served for nearly two years, until 2003.

She was further promoted to vice president, corporate banking at Citibank Kenya, where she served for nearly three years. During that period, she also served as a member of the Branch Credit Committee. Starting in January 2006, and for the next six and half years, Kilonzo served as the head of trade finance for the bank's customers in Kenya,  Uganda, Tanzania and Zambia, at the level of director.

In 2012, she was hired by Ecobank Transnational Incorporated as a senior group manager responsible for trade finance and based in Nairobi, Kenya's capital and largest city, serving in that role for four and half years. In November 2016, she was appointed as a CEO and managing director of Ecobank Rwanda.

Other considerations
In her capacity as the managing director, Alice Kalonzo–Zulu is a member of the board of directors of Ecobank Rwanda.

See also
 List of banks in Rwanda
 Lina Higiro
 Peace Uwase

References

External links
Website of Ecobank Rwanda
Ecobank Rwanda staff commemorate the Genocide Against the Tutsi for Kwibuka23

1969 births
Living people
21st-century Kenyan businesswomen
21st-century Kenyan businesspeople
Kenyan bankers
Kenyan chief executives
Alumni of the University of Warwick
Alumni of the University of Manchester